Baby, Baby, Baby is a 1958 album by Mindy Carson. The title track, "Baby Baby Baby" with lyrics by Mack David, music by Jerry Livingston was a No.12 hit single for Teresa Brewer who sang the song in the film Those Redheads from Seattle (1953).

Track listing
Baby, Baby, Baby	
I'm Not Just Anybody's Baby	
I Don't Want To Walk Without You, Baby	
Baby Face	
Don't Cry, Cry Baby	
My Melancholy Baby	
Everybody Loves My Baby	
I Can't Give You Anything But Love, Baby	
I'm Nobody's Baby	
My Baby Just Cares For Me	
I Found A New Baby	
Baby Won't You Please Come Home

References

1959 albums